William Dodery (August 1819 – 26 January 1912) was an Australian politician.

Born in Clonmel, Tipperary, Ireland, Dodery arrived in Sydney (New South Wales) with his father in 1825, and then moved to Launceston (Van Diemen's Land) six years later. He married Mary Webb at Longford in 1842 and became a land-owner and business proprietor, building the Blenheim Hotel there and establishing a coach-line for passengers between Launceston and the town.

He was elected to the House of Assembly for Norfolk Plains in 1861, and was re-elected in November 1862 and in October 1866, serving until his resignation in 1870 due to business commitments.

In March 1877 he returned to political life and was elected to the Tasmanian Legislative Council seat of Longford, continuing when his seat was redistributed as Westmorland in 1885. Dodery was re-elected a number of times before retiring from the Parliament on 7 May 1907 having served as President of the Legislative Council since 1904.

Dodery died in Longford, Tasmania, Australia on 26 January 1912.

References

1819 births
1912 deaths
Members of the Tasmanian House of Assembly
Members of the Tasmanian Legislative Council
19th-century Australian politicians
20th-century Australian politicians